Nourray is a commune in the Loir-et-Cher department of central France. The commune is located in the region of Centre-Val de Loire.

Population

References

See also
Communes of the Loir-et-Cher department

Communes of Loir-et-Cher